Big Beach (Tràigh Mhòr in Gaelic, pronounced "try vohr") is a  community located on the north side of the Boisdale Hills on the east side of the Great Bras D'Or Lake on Provincial Route 223, which runs from Leitches Creek to Little Narrows, through Central Cape Breton Island in the Canadian province of Nova Scotia. Located on the "Bras D'Or Lakes Scenic Drive" it is part of the Cape Breton Regional Municipality in Central Cape Breton Island.

At the time comprising the three small communities of Big Beach, Glasgow, and Big Brook, Big Beach was populated during the first half of the 19th century by Scots from the Outer Hebrides islands, specifically the Isle of Barra, as well as Benbecula and other islands in that chain, which are located off the Atlantic coast of Scotland.

Today, the descendants of these Roman Catholic "Barramen" still dominate Central Cape Breton Island's Gaelic culture. The area is still heavily influenced by Catholicism and the local priest was the law. Gaelic was the first language of the community until the middle of the 20th century. A campaign of violence and intimidation by the provincial school board led to the near extermination of Gaelic culture and language in Cape Breton. However, there has been a resurgence of the Gaelic language and culture promulgated through a local Feis an Eilein  (Festival of the Island) and Highland Village Museum , a Provincial Nova Scotia Living Museum in nearby Iona. The Gaelic language is now being taught to children attending the Rankin School of the Narrows. The Big Beach School is now a private residence and was replaced by the now closed grade school in Christmas Island.

The Canadian National Railway came through Central Cape Breton and Big Beach in the latter part of the 19th century, bringing a connection to the rest of North America. The railroad is still in operation, run by the Cape Breton and Central Nova Scotia Railway. "Section Men" were hired to upkeep sections of the track. It was a coveted job. Many men cut timber for rail ties to subsidize their income.

There was a rail spur to the beach at one time when a company from Belgium gathered sand to make porcelain china.

The area was mostly subsistence farming and there is still very little employment available in the area.

However, the area is popular for summer residents and there has been a resurgence of building recently.

References
Central Cape Breton Portal
Feis an Eilein
Highland Village Museum in Iona, NS

Communities in the Cape Breton Regional Municipality
General Service Areas in Nova Scotia